The Shirane-class destroyers were a pair of Japanese destroyers originally built during the late 1970s. They are built around a large central hangar which houses up to three helicopters and they are the natural successor of the s.

Design 
The Shirane class incorporates an improved design based on the Haruna-class destroyers. The ships propulsion include two steam boilers with two shafts that produce 70.000 hp and gives a maximum speed of 32 knots.

Its armament includes two Mk.42 127mm guns, two 20-mm Phalanx close-in weapon systems, one Surface-to-air RIM-7 Sea Sparrow launcher, torpedoes and anti-submarine rockets.
The ships has been replaced by the new s.

Ships in the class

Operational use
On December 15, 2007, a fire broke out on board Shirane near the rudder house as it was anchored at Yokosuka. It took seven hours to extinguish the fire, which injured four crew members.

On 27 October 2009, JS Kurama collided with a South Korean container ship under the Kanmonkyo Bridge in the Kanmon Straits off the coast of Japan.  While neither ship sunk, the bow of Kurama was badly damaged and burned for hours.  Three Kurama crew members were reported injured.

References

External links

GlobalSecurity.org; JMSDF DDH Shirane Class

 
Destroyer classes